The County of Hohenems was a sovereign county in the Holy Roman Empire.

History
It was ruled by the Counts of Hohenems from Hohenems. 

Parts of the county such as Vaduz had to be sold by the family because of bankruptcy. After the male line died out in 1759, the county came under suzerainty of the House of Habsburg. 

The head of the House of Habsburg continued carrying the title of "Count of Hohenems" in the grand title of the Emperor of Austria.

History of Vorarlberg